Ramón A. Domínguez (born November 24, 1976 in Caracas, Venezuela) is a retired Eclipse Award-winning champion jockey and Hall of Fame member in American thoroughbred horse racing.

Domínguez began riding horses at age 16 in his native Venezuela in show jumping then turned to riding thoroughbreds in flat racing events at La Rinconada Hippodrome. He emigrated to the United States where he began riding at Florida's Hialeah Park Race Track in 1996.

In 2001 he got his big break by becoming the winningest jockey in the United States. He repeated the feat in 2003, and in 2004 he won the Isaac Murphy Award for having the highest winning percentage among all American-based jockeys.

Domínguez was the regular rider of two-time Eclipse Award-winning turf champion Gio Ponti, whom he has ridden to victories in six Grade One stakes races including Belmont Park's Man o' War Stakes twice, as well as the Arlington Million, Frank E. Kilroe Mile Handicap and Shadwell Turf Mile Stakes twice. His first win in the Breeders' Cup came in 2004 when he rode Better Talk Now to victory in the Breeders' Cup Turf. His second Breeders' Cup victory was the 2011 Juvenile when he rode Hansen to victory in gate-to-wire fashion over Union Rags. His third and final win in the Breeders' Cup came in 2012, also in the Breeders' Cup Turf, when Little Mike upset the race at 17-1 odds.

Domínguez has won six races in a day on three occasions, most recently on July 22, 2012 when he rode six winners from seven mounts at Saratoga Race Course tying the same day win record by a jockey among all New York tracks. He is the second jockey in Saratoga's history to win six races on a single race card. He has also won five races in a day on several occasions at Aqueduct Racetrack, most recently on February 17, 2010 when he won the first five races on the card.

In 2012 Dominguez topped the New York Racing Association (NYRA) riding circuit for the fourth straight year with 322 victories, and was also the winner of the George Woolf Memorial Jockey Award, bestowed by his peers for excellent conduct and given by Santa Anita Park. Domínguez is the recipient of the 2010, 2011, and 2012 Eclipse Award for Outstanding Jockey. In 2012 set a new mark for single-season earnings by a jockey, when his mounts brought home $25,582,252 to shatter the 2003 bar of $23,354,960 set by Hall of Famer Jerry Bailey. 

On June 13, 2013, Dominguez announced his retirement due to head injuries suffered in a fall at Aqueduct Racetrack on January 18, 2013.

On April 25, 2016, Dominguez's induction into the National Museum of Racing and Hall of Fame was announced.

Year-end charts

References

External links
 Ramon A. Dominguez Official Website
 Ramon A. Dominguez at the NTRA

1976 births
American jockeys
American Champion jockeys
Sportspeople from Caracas
Living people
Venezuelan emigrants to the United States
United States Thoroughbred Racing Hall of Fame inductees